Choi Yo-sam (March 1, 1972 – January 3, 2008) was a Korean world boxing champion. He was born in Jeongeup, Jeollabukdo, South Korea.

Pro career 
Choi turned pro in 1993 and won the Lineal and WBC light flyweight titles in 1999 with a decision win over Saman Sorjaturong. He successfully defended the titles three times before losing it to Jorge Arce by a 6th round technical knockout in 2002. In 2003, he lost a decision to Beibis Mendoza for the interim WBA light flyweight title. In 2004, he moved up in weight to take on Lorenzo Parra for the WBA flyweight title and lost a decision.

Death 
On December 25, 2007, he successfully defended the WBO Intercontinental flyweight title with a unanimous decision victory over Heri Amol. In the 12th round, Choi was dropped with five seconds remaining, but beat the count and went on to win the fight (via the fighter saved by bell rule). He collapsed while still in the ring after the bout and was rushed to the Soonchunhyang University Hospital immediately after the fight in order to undergo emergency brain surgery. Choi was pronounced brain-dead on January 2, 2008, and died on January 3, 2008, when he was removed from a ventilator. LeeSSang made a song dedicated to him in their 5th album called CHAMPION.

His organs were donated to six patients with approval from his family. This action led the South Korean Government to award Choi with a medal.

See also 
List of light flyweight boxing champions
List of WBC world champions
Kim Duk-koo

References

External links 
 
 Looking at Yo Sam Choi
 Choi Yo-sam - CBZ Profile

1972 births
2008 deaths
Deaths due to injuries sustained in boxing
World Boxing Council champions
World light-flyweight boxing champions
World Boxing Organization champions
Sport deaths in South Korea
South Korean male boxers
People from Jeongeup
Sportspeople from North Jeolla Province